Lizy Tagliani (born 12 September 1970) is an Argentine actress, comedian, and presenter.

Biography
Lizy Tagliani was born in Resistencia, Chaco, has lived in Buenos Aires since her early childhood. At a young age, she began to work as a hairdresser for various Argentine entertainment figures, and to put on shows in nightclubs in Buenos Aires. Little by little, she gained notoriety in the media and joined radio and television programs in which she worked with personalities such as Susana Giménez, Marcelo Tinelli, Santiago del Moro, and Verónica Lozano.

She has also appeared as a comedic actress on stage and on television.

In a 2018 interview, Tagliani explained that as a trans woman, she could have changed the name and sex listed on her national ID (DNI) under the 2012 Gender Identity Law, but chose not to.

In April 2020, Tagliani announced her engagement to boyfriend Leo Alturria via Instagram.

On June 19, 2020, Tagliani tested positive for COVID-19 after an employee of her show El Precio Justo (The Fair Price) was infected days before.

Works

Films

Television

{| class="wikitable" style="font-size: 90%;"
! Year !! Title !! Role !! Notes !! Channel
|-
|2014 || Bailando 2014 ||  Replacement for "Loly" Antoniale on Adagio and Cuarteto  Contestant ||   Eliminated 17th || rowspan="2"|El Trece
|-
| 2015 || Bailando 2015 || Contestant ||  Eliminated 15th
|-
| rowspan="3"|2016 || Gran Hermano 2016: El debate || Panelist ||  ||rowspan="2"| América TV
|-
|| Gran Hermano 2016: El debate Prime Time || Panelist ||
|-
| Bailando 2016 || Contestant || Eliminated 10th || rowspan="2"|El Trece
|-
| rowspan="4"|2017 || Quiero vivir a tu lado || Silvia Troncoso || Principal cast
|-
| Peligro: sin codificar || Humorist ||  || rowspan="2"|Telefe
|-
| Susana Giménez || Lizy, the fishwife || Sketch: "La Banana Mágica" 
|-
| Bailando 2017 || Replacement juror || 2 episodes || El Trece
|-
| 2017–2018 ||  || Humorist ||  || rowspan="9"|Telefe
|-
| 2017–2019 ||  || Guest host || 4 episodes
|-
|  rowspan="4"|2018 ||  || Panelist Replacement host||    1 episode
|-
|  || Co-host || 
|-
| Drunk History: Pasado de Copas || Narrator || Episode: "El General, los caniches y La Diva"
|-
|  || Replacement co-host || 1 episode
|-
| rowspan="2"|2019–present
| El Precio Justo || Host || 
|-
| El Precio Justo, Especial Famosos || Host || 
|-
| rowspan="2"|2019 
|Susana Giménez: Pequeños gigantes
|Guest juror
| 3 episodes
|-
|2019 Martín Fierro Digital Awards
|Host
| 
| Infobae (streaming)
|-
| 2020 ||  || Host / Guest  || 5 episodes || Telefe 
|}

Theater
 Mamá, quiero ser... (2014), Buenos Aires
 Casa Fantasma (2015), Carlos Paz, Buenos Aires
 La Revolución del Humor (2015), Tour
 El Show de Lizy (2016), Carlos Paz
 Recargada (2016), Tour
 Libérate (2017), Mar del Plata
 Mi vecina favorita (2018), Mar del Plata, Tour
 Lizy, una chica diferente (2019), Buenos Aires
 Los Bonobos: El amor es ciego, sordo y mudo (2020), Buenos Aires

RadioEl club del Moro'' (2014-2019)

Awards and nominations

References

External links
 
 

1970 births
21st-century Argentine actresses
Argentine transgender people
Argentine women comedians
Gran Hermano (Argentine TV series) contestants
Argentine LGBT actors
Living people
People from Resistencia, Chaco
Transgender actresses
Participants in Argentine reality television series
Bailando por un Sueño (Argentine TV series) participants